Lekaferja AS is a ferry company that operates the Skei–Gutvik Ferry with the car ferry MF Leka connecting Leka to mainland Norway. The company was created to operate the ferry service when it was created in 1964, and has operated three ferries, all with the name Leka. Lekaferja is owned by Torghatten Trafikkselskap.

References

External links
 Time table

Ferry companies of Trøndelag
Transport companies established in 1964